Silvanus Njambari (28 August 1974 – 11 January 2003) was a Namibian footballer with Black Africa F.C. He competed for the Namibia national football team from 1998-2000, including the 1998 African Cup of Nations.

References

1974 births
2003 deaths
Namibia international footballers
Namibian men's footballers
1998 African Cup of Nations players
Black Africa S.C. players
Association footballers not categorized by position